The Stone House is the oldest building in Lake County, Northern California. The building is registered as California Historical Landmark #450 and is located in Hidden Valley Lake, California. It is open for touring quarterly and by appointment with the Stone House Historical Society.

History
The Stone House was built of local stone in 1853–54 by Robert Sterling. His wife was the first non-Indian woman to enter the Coyote Valley.

In 1861, when Lake County was split off from Napa County, John Cobb was hired to manage the Rancho Guenoc and Rancho Collayomi of the Ritchie estate. He moved with his wife and younger children into the Stone House, which had been abandoned, and farmed there for about three years.

It was rebuilt in 1894 and served as headquarters of the Rancho Guenoc, a former Mexican land grant rancho, and it was also the first store in Coyote Valley.

See also
Ranchos of Lake County, California
National Register of Historic Places listings in Lake County, California
List of Museums in the North Coast (California)

References

External links

 Historic Stone House at Hidden Valley Lake - Stone House Historical Society

Stone houses in the United States
Houses in Lake County, California
History of Lake County, California
California Historical Landmarks
Museums in Lake County, California
Historic house museums in California